Jacob Gagne (born August 27, 1993) is an American motorcycle racer. For 2020, Gagne is contracted to ride in the American Superbike Championship, partnered by Cameron Beaubier.

Career
He competed in the Spanish Moto2 Championship, the Red Bull AMA Rookies Cup and won the Red Bull MotoGP Rookies Cup in 2010. He was the AMA Pro Daytona Sportbike champion in 2014, the MotoAmerica Superstock 1000 champion in 2015 and a MotoAmerica AMA Superbike Championship regular in 2016 and 2017.

During the 2017 season, he was called up to Ten Kate Racing as a replacement rider, at the July Laguna Seca round due to Nicky Hayden's death in May, and twice-again later in the season to substitute for injured Stefan Bradl at Magny-Cours and Losail.

In December 2017, he signed to compete in the 2018 Superbike World Championship series aboard a Honda Fireblade SP2 for Ten Kate Racing as teammate to Leon Camier.

After the 2018 season in World Superbikes, Gagne returned to race in the North American Superbike Championship series riding for Scheibe BMW.

Career statistics

Red Bull MotoGP Rookies Cup

Races by year
(key) (Races in bold indicate pole position, races in italics indicate fastest lap)

Grand Prix motorcycle racing

By season

Races by year
(key) (Races in bold indicate pole position; races in italics indicate fastest lap)

Superbike World Championship

Races by year
(key) (Races in bold indicate pole position; races in italics indicate fastest lap)

* Season still in progress.

References

External links

American motorcycle racers
Living people
1993 births
Moto2 World Championship riders
Superbike World Championship riders
People from Ramona, San Diego County, California